Note: This ship should not be confused with the motorboat Barracuda, considered for service as patrol boat USS Barracuda (SP-23) during the same era.

USS Barracuda (SP-845) was an armed motorboat that served in the United States Navy as a patrol vessel from 1917 to 1919.

Barracuda was built in 1912 by James E. Graves at Marblehead, Massachusetts, as a private motorboat of the same name. The U.S. Navy acquired her from her owner, Mr. R. W. McEwan on a free lease on 18 June 1917 for World War I service. She was commissioned as USS Barracuda (SP-845) on 31 October 1917.

Assigned to the section patrol in the 3rd Naval District, Barracuda spent her entire naval career patrolling the waters in and around New York Harbor.

Decommissioned on 13 February 1919, Barracuda was returned to her owner.

References

Department of the Navy: Naval Historical Center: Online Library of Selected Images: Civilian Ships: USS Barracuda (SP-845), 1917–1919.
NavSource Online: Section Patrol Craft Photo Archive Barracuda (SP 845)

Patrol vessels of the United States Navy
World War I patrol vessels of the United States
Ships built in Marblehead, Massachusetts
1912 ships